Aethiessa is a genus of scarab beetles belonging to the subfamily Cetoniinae.

Species
 Aethiessa feralis Erichson, 1841 
 Aethiessa floralis (Fabricius, 1787) 
 Aethiessa inhumata (Gory & Percheron, 1833) 
 Aethiessa martini Bedel, 1889 
 Aethiessa mesopotamica Burmeister, 1842 
 Aethiessa squamosa (Gory & Percheron, 1833) 
 Aethiessa szekessyi Brasavola, 1939 
 Aethiessa zarudnyi Kiserirzkij, 1939

References
 Biolib

Scarabaeidae genera
Cetoniinae